Judith Saint George (February 26, 1931 – June 10, 2015) was an American author, most famous for writing So You Want to Be President? Author and illustrator David Small was awarded the 2001 Caldecott Medal for his illustrations in the book. She has written more than 40 books, most being historical fiction. Ms. St. George was born in Westfield, NJ and is a graduate of Smith College. She was a resident of Connecticut at the time of her death on June 10, 2015.

Bibliography 

 Turncoat Winter, Rebel Spring (1970) 
 The Girl with Spunk (1975) 
 Mystery Isle (1976, 2007) 
 By George, Bloomers! (1976, 1989) 
 The Secret In The Old House (1976) 
 The Shadow of the Shaman (1977) 
 The Shad Are Running (1977) , illustrated by Richard Cuffari
 The Halloween Pumpkin Smasher (1978) , illustrated by Margot Tomes
 The Halo Wind (1978) 
 Mystery at St. Martin's (1979) 
 The Amazing Voyage of the New Orleans (1980) 
 Call Me Margo (1981) 
 The Mysterious Girl in the Garden (1981) , illustrated by Margot Tomes
 The Brooklyn Bridge: They Said it Couldn't Be Built (1982, 1993) 
 In the Shadow of the Bear (1983) 
 Do You See What I See (1983) 
 Mt. Rushmore Story (1985) 
 What's Happening to My Junior Year? (1987) 
 Who's Scared Not Me (1987) 
 Panama Canal (1989) 
 The White House (1990) 
 Mason and Dixon's Line of Fire (1991) 
 Dear Dr. Bell...Your Friend, Helen Keller (1993) 
 Crazy Horse (1994) 
 To See with the Heart (1996) 
 Sacagawea (1997) 
 Betsy Ross: Patriot of Philadelphia (1997) , illustrated by Sasha Meret
 So You Want to Be President? (2000) , illustrated by David Small 
 So You Want to Be an Inventor? (2002) , illustrated by David Small 
 You're on Your Way, Teddy Roosevelt (2004) , illustrated by Matt Faulkner
 The Journey of the One and Only Declaration of Independence (2005) , illustrated by Will Hillenbrand
 Haunted (2005) 
 In the Line of Fire: Presidents' Lives at Stake (2005) 
 John and Abigail Adams: An American Love Story (2005) 
 Take the Lead, George Washington (2005) , illustrated by Daniel Powers
 So You Want to Be an Explorer? (2005) , illustrated by David Small 
 The Ghost, the White House and Me (2007) 
 Make Your Mark, Franklin Roosevelt (2007) , illustrated by Britt Spencer
 Stand Tall, Abe Lincoln (2008) , illustrated by Matt Faulkner
 Zarafa: The Giraffe Who Walked to the King (2009) , illustrated by Britt Spencer
 The Duel: The Parallel Lives of Alexander Hamilton and Aaron Burr (2009) 
 What Was the Lewis and Clark Expedition? (2014) , illustrated by Tim Foley

Critical response 
Mystery at St. Martin's (1979) was a Dorothy Canfield Fisher Children's Book Award Nominee (1981).

The Brooklyn Bridge: They Said it Couldn't Be Built (1982, 1993) was a National Book Award Finalist for Children's Books, Nonfiction (1983).

Betsy Ross: Patriot of Philadelphia (1997) received the Fraunces Tavern Museum Book Award for Juvenile Literature (1998).

So You Want to Be President? (2000) received the following accolades:

 Caldecott Medal (2001)
 Pennsylvania Young Readers' Choice Award for Grades 3-6 (2002)
 Dorothy Canfield Fisher Children's Book Award Nominee (2002)

References

External links
 
 

1931 births
American children's writers
Smith College alumni
Writers from Connecticut
2015 deaths
American historical fiction writers